N.G.Chebotarev Research Institute for Mathematics and Mechanics is the Research Institute, which existed from 1934 to 2011 in Kazan. N.G.Chebotarev Research Institute for Mathematics and Mechanics of Kazan State University was established on September, 1 in 1934 by order No.294 of 13 April 1934 signed by the Russian SFSR's People's Commissariat for education and the order No. 55 of the KSU of 15 September 1934. It was named after N.G.Chebotarev by the Decree of the USSR Council of Ministers of 21 July 1947. According to the decree the Department of Mathematics of the Russian Academy of Sciences' (DM RAS) general meeting signed on 21 December 1992, RIMM was under the research and methodology supervision of the RAS's Division of Mathematics. Initiators of the RIMM's creation were N.G.Chebotarev, N.N.Parfentyev, P.A.Shirokov, N.G.Chetaev, B.M.Gagaev.

In 2011, RIMM was reorganized and included into the recently formed N.I. Lobachevsky Institute of Mathematics and Mechanics as a research center.

History

In June 1934, it was to hold All-Soviet Union Congress of Mathematicians II, and N.G.Chebotarev wanted to raise the question of the Institute organization on the Congress to obtain its authoritative support. But the question of Institute establishing received favorable decision in People's commissariat for education of the Russian SFSR before the Congress: the order "about allocation of Kazan University in excess of budget resources to strengthen scientific research in Mathematics and Biology, and the inclusion of the Mechanics and Mathematics Research Institute into a network of research establishments in 1935", signed by the People's Commissar A.S.Bubnov, appeared. The All- Soviet  Union Congress of Mathematicians II (Leningrad, 24–30 June 1934) supported the initiative of Kazan mathematicians pointing to the "urgent need for a mathematical institute organization in Kazan" (see. Resolution in the "Proceedings of the Congress", vol. 1, 1935, p. 80). The institute was opened on 1 September 1934 at the order of the university vice-principal G.B. Bagautdinov. It was created the organizing committee of the institute, consisting of N.G.Chebotarev, N.P.Parfentyev, P.A.Shirokov, N.G.Chetaev, B.M.Gagaev. The organizing committee was to develop the structure of the institute and select employees.

Beginning
From 1934–1937, the University allocated the room in a geometrical office to Institute. It was the top floor (except large audience) of the small two-storied building on the corner of Astronomicheskaya and Lenin (nowadays – Kremlin) streets and then two more rooms of the first floor were also transferred to the institute. The institute was subdivided into administrative and technical part and the scientific part .The administrative and technical part included the director (N. G. Chebotarev), the academic secretary, the technical secretary, the watchman, the librarian, and then the accountant. And the scientific part (17 units) consisted of sections (departments) of algebra (N. G. Chebotarev), mathematical analysis (B. M. Gagaev), geometry (P.A.Shirokov), mechanics (N. N. Parfentyev).

Members
• Full members (the founding members) – N. G. Chebotarev, N. N. Parfentiy, P. A. Shirokov, N. G. Chetaev, B. M. Gagaev, K. P. Persidskiy.
• 1st category scientific staff (senior researcher) –  V.A. Yablokov, E. I. Grigoryev, I. D. Ado, H. M. Mushtari, G. V. Kamenkov, I. G. Malkin
• Scientific staff (junior researcher) – M. S. Aminov, S. E. Grigoryev, B. L. Laptev, I. A. Shcherbakov
For some time (May, 1936 – October, 1937) the unit of theoretical physics had still worked. It was headed by the young Polish physicist M. G. Matisson– Hadamard's student – in the rank of full member. He was engaged in study of waves' diffusion in Riemannian space and the theory of quantization and spin in relativistic one. Senior research associates S. A. Altshuler and I. A. Shcherkbakov worked in this unit.

With the course of time the structure of institute somehow changed. Employees professionally developed (thesis defence) and were promoted, new sections appeared there. So, in 1937 the stability section distinguished itself. There was large group of graduate students affiliated with RIMM. They are M. I. Almukhamedov, K.A. Berezin, L.I. Gavrilov, K.Z. Galimov, F.D. Gakhov, A.K. Kostyuk, P. A. Kuzmin, G.K. Maksudov, N. N. Meyman, V. V. Morozov, G. S. Salekhov and others. Some of them subsequently became outstanding scientists, and V. V. Morozov headed institute after N. G. Chebotaryov's death.

The terms of references developed in institute's units had theoretical nature and belonged to new modern areas of mathematics and mechanics. Algebra: a resolvent problem and continuous groups (N. G. Chebotarev, I.D.Ado); the continued polynoms (L. I. Gavrilov, N. N. Meyman); theories of Lie groups (N. G. Chebotaryov); Galois theory (N. G. Chebotarev); algebra and tensor analysis (N. G. Chebotarev). Analysis: orthogonal polynoms (B. M. Gagaev); special points of the differential equations systems (M. I. Alkmuchamedov); Chaplygin's method applicating to the n-order linear differential equations (G.Kh.Maksukdov); linear boundary equations for analytical functions (F.D.Gakhov); generalization of the law of large numbers (K.P.Perksidskiy). Geometry: linear winding functions (P.A.Shirokov); symmetric spaces with uncertain metrics (P.A.Shirokov); tensor analysis (P.A.Shirokov); conjugating in zero-systems (V. A. Yablokov); Finsler spaces (B. L. Laptev). Mechanics: stability of dynamics' path, Kronecker's characteristics and their application in questions of motion stability(N. G. Chetayev); general problems of the stability theory (K.P.Persidsky, I. G. Malkin); some questions of the vibration theory (N. N. Parfentyev). In 1933-1934 five scientific seminars functioned. In particular, during the geometrical seminar P.A.Shirokov studied with the staff of department, students and graduate students the general theory of differential invariants generalized spaces that were being developed in those years in the US by Princeton geometrical school (L. Eisenhart, O. Veblen, T. Thomas, D. Thomas, J. Whitehead, etc.). He also reported on his researches on the symmetric spaces that were taken into consideration for the first time in 1925. Besides, messages were made by other staff and students.

Young algebraists often attended P.A.Shirokov's seminar because N. G. Chebotarev believed that the tensor analysis is necessary for them. Mathematical competitions were annually held for the Kazan school children in order to involve talented youth in physical and mathematical faculty. N. G. Chebotarev and the staff of faculty were vigorously engaged in their organization. He charged the selection of tasks to E.I.Grigoryev.

1938 to 1954

Since 1938, financing of institute was sharply reduced. In 1938, the staff of RIMM consisted only of N. G. Chebotarev, H.M.Mushtari, G. V. Kamenkov, M. I. Almukhamedov and two junior research associates despite the drastic measures undertaken by N. G. Chebotarev, and in 1940 there were only four employees. University professors and lecturers were engaged in research work in institute on a voluntary basis. With the beginning of the Great Patriotic War the young staff of institute went to the front to protect the Homeland with all Soviet people. Financing of institute had stopped, but scientific life continued. N. G. Chebotarev and other scientists together with the staff of the Moscow and Leningrad institutes, who were evacuated to Kazan, tried to choose for research subjects closest to practice and to defensive subject. So, N. G. Chebotarev was occupied with the Routh–Hurwitz problem, questions of minimaxes. N. G. Chetayev solved problems of airplane stability during the flight, a missile in flight, and other. There were organized joint meetings of the Kazan physical and mathematical association with division of the Moscow mathematical association.

Under severe conditions of military rear N. N. Parfentyev (22 January 1943) and the dean of Physics and Mathematics Division P.A.Shirokov (26 February 1944) died. In October, 1943 the solemn celebration of the 150-th anniversary from the birth of N.I.Lobachevsky was carried out by the University, Academy of Sciences of the USSR, and physical and mathematical association with active participation of N. G. Chebotarev, P.A.Shirokov and B.L.Laptev. There was also organized the scientific session devoted to this date. Prominent geometricians A.P.Kotelnikov and D.M.Sintsov, graduates of the Kazan University, arrived at the celebration. By the end of war the young mathematicians and mechanics demobilized from the Soviet Army began to come back.

In 1944, N. G. Chebotarev managed to achieve resumption of institute work, according to the order of the Russian SFSR's People's Commissariat for Education of 1 September 1944 when the funds were allocated again, and the institute began to work in the following structure: the director – N. G. Chekbotarev, senior research associates – I.D.Ado, B. M. Gagaev, V. V. Morozov, V. A. Yablokov, research associates – S. N. Andrianov, A.3. Petrov, B. L. Laptev, G.G. Tumashev, the laboratory assistant – V. G. Sabitova, computists – A. V. Mesis, A. N. Khovansky, the accountant, the cashier.  Then senior research associate, unit chief A. P. Norden, unit chief F.D.Gakhov, senior research associates M. T. Nuzhin, N. N. Meyman, P. I. Petrov, research associates A. V. Dorodnov, E. K. Stolyarova, V. M. Gerasimova, academic secretary B. I. Kushchev were added. Work of institute and association strongly quickened. N. G. Chebotarev was chosen as the chairman of Physical and Mathematical association, and joint meetings of the Institute and association were held almost weekly (for 1945 – 41 meetings) with active participation of mathematical youth. Soon it was succeeded to renew the edition of the "News of the Kazan Physical and Mathematical Society" journal (from 1945). N. G. Chebotarev died on July 2, 1947 at the peak of his scientific and organizational activity full of new creative plans. In recognition of scientific merits of N.G.Chebotarev institute was named in his honor. Scientific works of N. G. Chebotarev were published by Academy of Sciences of the USSR in 3 volumes. He was awarded by the State Award posthumously. 
Next years (from 1947 to 1954) the director was V. V. Morozov. Scientific achievements of institute for these post-war years were considerable, but they cannot be listed here. Let us list surnames of some scientists who were fruitfully working in RIIMM: V. V. Morozov, F.D. Gakhov, A.P. Norden, S. N. Andrianov, M. T. Nuzhin, G.G. Tumashev, B. L. Laptev, A.Z. Petrov, P. I. Petrov, S.F. Saykin, A.V. Sachenkov. In 1954 V. V. Morozov asked to relieve him of the director's duties, and G.G. Tukmashev – the prominent mechanic whose doctoral dissertation (1943) laid the foundation in the Kazan University of the new scientific direction for inverse boundary problems (IBP) –  was appointed the director.  Since then and up-till-now this direction is one of the most productive in RIMM.

It began the new period in RIMM's life connected with researches on inverse boundary problems and on oil filtration through porous medium. Questions of rational development of the oil deposits that were found in Tataria were especially up-to-date.  As for the first problem, its wide applied prospects began to appear further. Only one senior research associate P. I. Petrov continued the researches in the classical direction that was put in Kazan by F. M. Suvorov in 1871 (the theory of invariants of Riemannian spaces).

1950 to 1980
Life of the Institute prior to the beginning of the nineties can be divided into three periods: the fifties, a period of stability (1960–1985) and the years of perestroika (rebuilding). The boundaries between them are defined by abrupt changes in external conditions of life of University scientists. In the early fifties the staff of the institute is sharply reduced due to the prohibition of combining teaching and research work within the University. This prohibition has deprived RIMM of professors and associate professors who were the best mathematicians of the University and composed almost entire academic staff of the institute. Thus, in 1950 the academic staff consisted of seven people (V. Morozov, M. T. Nuzhin, S. N. Andrianov, I. P. Petrov, A.V. Masis, E.K. Stolyarova, V. M. Gerasimova), and in 1954 it counted only five (S. F. Saykin, R. M. Nasyrov, Y. M. Molokovich, B. Pleshchinskiy I., I. P. Petrov). It was necessary to find extremely rare antecedently category of University employees – skillful scientific staff – to overcome the crisis and fill the resulting voids in the new environment. The growth of this population demanded time and external motivation. For RIMM such motivation was the recommendation of the Tatar regional Committee of the CPSU to mechanicians to expand research on the oil subject. In response to this instruction there was organized and was successfully working a seminar on underground hydromechanics, the mechanics sector of RIMM was enhanced. 
Since 1953, this sector appended with graduates and University staff, there were deployed theoretical studies on the calculation of pressure fields in heterogeneous oil reservoirs and of the oil-water contact boundaries promotion. There were also created models of oil reservoir, that allowed to observe the filtration of liquids in a porous medium.

In the 1950s, the research of inverse boundary value problems (IBVP) was being developed actively. Thus, M.T.Nuzhin gave general formulation of IBVP for analytical functions, classification of IBVP, methods of their solution and proposed the new approach to the weirs' basis designing. In the beginning of 1960s RIMM was extended: mechanics and mathematics were enforced, and new units and laboratories were opened for the purpose of new scientific branches' development. The sector of mechanics was transformed into unit and laboratory of subsurface hydromechanics (USH and LSH). The unit of boundary value problems segregated from USH. There were also created unit of hydromechanics(UH) and laboratory  of envelopes' mechanics(LEM). Mathematical subdivisions as the Unit of Cybernetics (UC) and the Unit of the theory of probability and mathematical statistics (UTP and MS) were organized. All the units and laboratories of the revived Institute had tried to develop the new scientific areas. They managed to cope with this task. So, for example, the research of the theory of filtration in RIMM showed qualities of center for the development of new scientific directions. As a complex organism, the Institute required a lot of attention. Professor B. L. Laptev - prominent geometrician -  was appointed for the position of the institute's Director, instead of  G. G. Tumashev who could not double-job as the head of RIMM and also chairman of the Department of aerohydromechanics. During B.L.Laptev's leadership (1961–1980) RIMM was being developed. It gained recognition as one of the largest University research centers in the country.

Main achievements of that period. In the Unit of Cybernetics the theory of probabilistic automation devices and methods for the synthesis of probabilistic processors for computers were built. It became the basis for a processor that increases the speed of solving a wide class of problems in statistical modeling creation. There was developed CAD of lift systems, intended to optimize the operation of transport systems and traffic. Works of UC were widely recognized by the end of the 1960s. In 1969 in Kazan the first all-Union Symposium on probabilistic automation devices was organized and held. The activities of the Unit of probability theory and mathematical statistics were focused on the study of probabilistic structures associated with other areas of mathematics. The staff of the Unit developed a topological method of the study of probability in functional spaces. There was developed a new concept in stochastic analysis based on the use of spaces of Sobolev type, justified a new approach to the problem of the guarantee of statistical inference. New efficient statistical criteria were constructed and investigated. Thus, the system of warranty of quality control of metal products – which allowed reducing the consumption of metal for the control of maintaining the level of quality – was created. The algorithm for image recognition based on the new characteristics of non-isotropic random fields was proposed. The results served as the basis for the creation of such research areas as "Probabilistic structures and their applications" in Kazan University. All-Union school on non-commutative probability theory, organized by RIMM in 1971, greatly stimulated the development of this direction.

In the USH and LSH, original methods of calculation of pressure fields and oil saturation in heterogeneous formations were studied. Scientists made a significant contribution to the theory of nonlinear filtering abnormally viscous oil, developed mathematical foundations of the theory of relaxational filtration. They also proposed and justified a new approach to the study tasks of filtration consolidation. In LSH a number of models were constructed for the study of filtration processes. After experiments the method for increasing oil recovery was offered. These results are reflected in a number of monographs.

The main activity of the Unit of hydromechanics was the theory of fluid flows with free boundaries (hydrodynamics of high speeds). The Unit developed original methods of solution and calculation of nonlinear problems of non-separable and cavitating flow around an airfoil near the free surface.  Scientists also studied oscillating profile with a separation of the jets, the profiles' grating and the problems of electrochemical dimensional processing of metals. The obtained results were generally recognized, reflected in the number of special reports, books and monographs on the theory of jets and cavitation.

The Unit of boundary value problems and the analog modeling laboratory (founded in 1976) made a great contribution to the theory of hydrodynamic design of objects with given properties. There were developed methods of underground dams' contour construction. The number of new tasks the explosion in pulse-hydrodynamic formulation were solved. The Department developed new methods of building of high-performance airfoils of quasi-solutions as UBVP, investigated the issues of unvalence in solutions of these problems. The research results were applied in various project and research organizations. A number of monographs was written. School on inverse boundary value problems, established in Kazan University, was recognized in the country and had authority among specialists.

In 1974, in RIMM the Department of gas dynamics was established on the basis of the Unit of fluid mechanics. The main direction of his research was numerical simulation of gas flow lasers and optical systems for them. There were developed methods for the calculation of transonic vibrationally nonequilibrium gas flows in nozzles La-Val and methods for the calculation of turbulent wakes and jets. Scientists obtained some significant results in modeling gas discharge lasers, optical systems and the divergence of the laser radiation. Thanks to efforts of the Unit new for KSU scientific direction – physical gas dynamics – was created in a short time.

Laboratory of mechanics of envelopes (LME) was founded in 1960 for study the mechanical behavior of thin-walled constructions. It developed methods of determining stress-strain state of plates and plates under local loads and methods of calculation of free vibrations and stability of envelopes. There was created highly theoretical-experimental method that allowed solving of a wide range of tasks. In 1973 in LME scientists created the first holographic installation for non-contact study of the surfaces' shape, fields of displacements and deformations of thin-walled structures. Methods, developed in LME, found application in the construction of aircraft, pipelines, bulk tanks, optomechanical constructions and other constructions. The Kazan University became the main organization of the Ministry of higher education of the USSR on the problem "development of the General theory and methods of analysis of envelopes, plates and rod systems".

The period of 1960-80s for RIMM can be characterized as the time of "stability and peaceful scientific creativity". First of all, being engaged in science in those years was considered very prestigious. On the one hand, the number of researchers was fixed. On the other hand, the financing was purely fiscal, but it was delivered on time and in full extent. In addition to the natural interest and abilities the motivation for the pursuing of science was training (defense of candidate and doctoral dissertations). It provided high salary and position in society. Usually, after defense of thesis and earning the academic rank of senior scientist or associate professors, person could afford to reduce the pace of scientific work, becoming a "rentier in science".  It means that person obtained new scientific results in such amount and of such quality that it allowed to keep his/her position for the next tender period (normally five years) and, as a consequence, state salary. The dissertation involved active testing of the obtained results (publications, presentations at scientific conferences). So, it was difficult to be published in leading scientific journals, even with very good results. Publications in international journals were rare because it was necessary to obtain a special permission to be published abroad. Finally, Soviet editions had a range of journals in almost all fields of knowledge. However, the practice of "sporty" mathematics was compulsory (a term was coined by Professor B. P. Komrakov – the winner of N.I.Lobachevsky gold medal "For outstanding results in the field of geometry" in the contest 1997. The chief research officer of RIMM made a comparison between professional science and sports. He thought that professional scientist (mathematician) had to obtain scientific results of the appropriate level as well as masters of sport should reassert their sports category).

During this period, there was total hierarchy in the system of science management at the University. At that time the administrative staff of the University RI was could function as a mediator between a certain performer (researcher) and superior body (Ministry). They accepted from superior body instructions and transferred them up various references, future plans and scientific reports on the results of the studies. Those reports were not reviewed and read by anyone excluding the officials of the Ministry of education. They only grounded for writing off of budget amounts. In 1980, B. L. Laptev handed in his resignations of Director of RIMM (by age). His successor was Professor N. B.Ilyinsky. The new management paid a lot of attention to strengthening of facilities and public prestige of RIMM. The Institute attained the status of the first category Research Institute and receives the working areas next to the University's main building. In 1984, RIMM celebrated the 50th anniversary. Scientific conference was devoted to the anniversary of the institute. The conference called "Modern problems of mathematics and mechanics".

During the years of perestroika (rebuilding), the institute was flourishing. It seemed that the abolition of prohibition on payment for employees of Research Institute according to commercial agreements would give new opportunities for the development of applied research. However, it was not so. In terms of inflation, state budget financing of University Research Institutes was virtually frozen. The industry was in crisis and commercial contracts were not acute. The awareness of the changes lagged behind the rapid changes of the reality.

In 1990, N. B. Ilyinskiy handed in his resignations of Director, and this position was occupied by Professor A. V. Kosterin. At the beginning of the 1990s the RIMM's staff consisted of 15 Doctors and 50 Candidates of Sciences. A number of members were completing work on a doctoral dissertation, the number of postgraduate students was growing, scientific links with various research centers, including foreign ones, were strengthened. In 1992 RIMM was included in the Division of mathematics of the Russian Academy of Sciences as an institution and managed by it. Despite a steady reduction in financing, RIMM celebrated the 60th anniversary (1994) with the hope for better future. Moreover, it actively developed its traditional research areas. The realities of early period of Institute's life dispelled many unfulfilled hopes and affected personnel policy and scientific activity. Unfortunately, many leading scientists were forced to move to a teaching job. Thus, the time for scientific job was reduced. However most of them kept in touch with the Institute and continued to work there on grants. A.V. Kosterin also moved to the faculty of Economics of University.  Since 1994 Professor A.M.Elizarov was the Director of RIMM.

The 1990s

Over the past decade, the structure of RIMM was changed. Four divisions were opened: mathematics (headed by Professor F. G. Avkhadiev), mechanics (headed by D. SC.M. A. G. Egorov), mathematical modeling (headed by Professor A. M. Elizarov) and computer science (headed by, Professor F. M. Ablaev). New mathematical units were organized. Unit of algebra and mathematical logic (1995), Unit of mathematical analysis, Unit of the theory of filtration (1993); Unit of computer science (1995); Unit of geometry, (1996) were among them. There were opened Unit of computational mathematics and applied mathematical physics on the basis of Unit of mathematical modeling. Two laboratories were functioning in the Department of mechanics. They were laboratories of mechanics of shells (head lab. Professor A. I. Golovanov) and modeling of oil field development. The computer science Division included the laboratory of information technology (1998, head. lab. – T. E. Yakubov), database technologies (since 2001, head. lab. – E. V. Uraltsev) and modeling of institutional actors and processes (since 2003, head. lab. – Assoc. E. A. Knyazev).

A sharp deterioration in basic state funding led to reduction of the number of support units and administrative staff. It also caused the shifting of the staff to part-time and commercial contracts. Thanks to support of the KSU rector, deans of the faculty of mechanics and mathematics and the faculty of computational mathematics and Cybernetics, some academic staff worked on regular basis of these faculties or fully transitioned to teaching at the University, while remaining part-time workers in RIMM.

Recent changes
In 2011, it was decided to join RIMM under the N.I. Lobachevsky Institute of mathematics and mechanics.

References

1934 establishments in Russia
2011 disestablishments in Russia
Kazan Federal University